Rhosus is a genus of moths of the family Noctuidae. The genus was erected by Francis Walker in 1854.

Species
 Rhosus aguirreri Berg, 1882
 Rhosus albiceps Draudt, 1919
 Rhosus columbiana Hampson, 1910
 Rhosus denieri Köhler, 1936
 Rhosus isabella Dognin, 1898
 Rhosus judsoni (Schaus, 1933)
 Rhosus leuconoe Felder, 1874
 Rhosus ornata Jörgensen, 1935
 Rhosus ovata Rothschild, 1896
 Rhosus pampeana Jörgensen, 1935
 Rhosus posticus Walker, 1854
 Rhosus spadicea Felder, 1874
 Rhosus storniana Köhler, 1936

References

Agaristinae